Suki Schorer is an American ballet dancer, ballet mistress, teacher, and writer.
She danced with George Balanchine's New York City Ballet from 1959 to 1972.
Suki Schorer teaches at the School of American Ballet, the official school of the New York City Ballet and is a Balanchine Trust répétiteur.

Biography
Suki Schorer received her early professional training at the San Francisco Ballet School and joined the San Francisco Ballet in 1956. She continued her ballet studies with Lew Christensen as a member of the Company and also attended the University of California at Berkeley. In 1959, at the invitation of George Balanchine, she joined the New York City Ballet where she took his daily classes for over a decade. In 1968, she was made a principal dancer. Her repertory included principal roles in Apollo, Serenade, Concerto Barocco, Symphony in C, Ivesiana, Stars and Stripes, Tarantella and Jewels among others. Balanchine made solo roles on her in Don Quixote, Raymonda Variations, Harlequinade, and A Midsummer Night's Dream.

Almost from the beginning of her tenure at the New York City Ballet, she began to teach at the School of American Ballet and she occasionally taught company class. Later, Mr. B asked her to teach a "newcomers" class for dancers joining the company. At his request, she toured the US as a talent scout for the School of American Ballet and assisted him in seminars for ballet teachers that were organized with support from the Ford Foundation.

On her retirement from the Company in 1972, Mr. B organized a new class of advanced girls at SAB of which she was to be the principal teacher. In 1998, she was appointed to the Brown Foundation Senior Faculty Chair at the School, which remains her principal commitment. In addition to teaching, she has staged a ballet annually for SAB's Workshop and excerpts for appearances in other venues by SAB students.

She lectures on Balanchine aesthetics and guest teaches widely in the United States and abroad (School of Bolshoi). 
In Europe, Scuola di Ballo del Teatro alla Scala in Milan and Ecole de Danse de l'Opéra National de Paris.

Publications
She is also a dance writer:
 contribution to 
 
 1999 : Suki Schorer on Balanchine Technique, Knopf. In 2000 winner of de la Torre Bueno Prize, translated in French  and in Italian. A Japanese edition is in progress.
 contribution to 
 contribution to 
 contribution to 
 
 contribution to

Videography
 1992 : Music for ballet class- Intermediate Pointe Class, VHS/DVD Bodarc Productions
 1995 : The Balanchine Essays –  series of 9 VHS/DVDs –, The Balanchine Library. Nonesuch, 1995–96. Analysis of details of Balanchine's approach to classical technique, with  Merrill Ashley
 1997 :Marie-Jeanne coaching Concerto Barocco with John Taras and Suki Schorer  VHS. The G.Balanchine Foundation
 1997 : Encore VHS/DVD – Ballet Pointe class, Bodarc Productions
 1998 : Balanchine lives! – Arte – VHS
 1999 : contribution to Antonina Tumkovsky – 50 years at the School of American Ballet, VHS/DVD – SAB
 2001 : Living a Ballet Dream: Six Dancers Tell Their Stories – Richard Blanshard – SAB
 2003 : Legends – Beginning Pointe Class, VHS, Bodarc Productions
 2008 :  School of American Ballet, serving the classical vision DVD – SAB
 2008 : Bringing Balanchine back  DVD

Awards
 1992 : Who’s Who in America.
 1997 : Distinguished Teacher in the Arts – National Foundation for the Advancement of the Arts.
 1998 : Dance Magazine Award.
 2000 : De la Torre Bueno Prize
 2001 : Century Association of New York

Bibliography
 
 
 La tecnica e lo stile di Balanchine, Carla Wertenstein, Accademia Nazionale di Danza, Roma 2007

References

External links
Hilary Ostlere (June 7, 1998) DANCE; Inspired by Balanchine, Now an Inspiration Herself. New York Times
 Gia Kourlas (June 3, 2006) NY Times/ Staging Balanchine for the School of American Ballet's Annual Workshop Performances. New York Times
 Mindy Aloff (July 17, 2007) Profile of School of American Ballet’s Suki Schorer: Stager of The Four Temperaments for the 2007 Workshop. Exploredance 
 Joan Acocella (February 23, 2009) Old-Time Religion. The New Yorker
Suki Schorer y la tecnica Balanchine. Danza Ballet (2009)
Ariane Dolfuss (December 2010) "Balanchine de A à Z", Danser Magazine, Paris
 Suki Schorer – Teaching Balanchine's style for 40 years. Dance-teacher.com (2012-01-31)

Balanchine Trust repetiteurs
Ballet mistresses
Ballet teachers
American ballerinas
New York City Ballet dancers
American women writers
Living people
School of American Ballet faculty
Year of birth missing (living people)